NTSC-C is a regional lockout created in 2003 by Sony Computer Entertainment for the official launch of its PlayStation 2 gaming system into the mainland Chinese market.

Mainland Chinese market
The system's original model, then called PlayStation 2, was launched throughout 2000, 2001 and 2002 in Japan, North America, Europe, Oceania and South East Asia, but it was not introduced in mainland China because of the local mass piracy system. In November 2003, Sony China Chairman Hiroshi Soda explained the situation:

However the situation changed in November 2003 as Sony China announced the PlayStation 2 (SCPH-50009 "Satin Silver" type) was planned to be launched in mainland China for Christmas, official release date December 20, 2003. Sales would be first limited to five large industrialized cities Beijing, Shanghai, Guangzhou, Shenzhen and Chengdu, then distribution would start in the whole country. However, on the eve of Christmas, arguing an "unfavorable environment," Sony China delayed the mainland release to next year with the system's new "slim" type PSTwo and sales limited to Shanghai and Guangzhou. Meanwhile, Kenichi Fukunaga, a Sony Japan spokesman in Tokyo, reportedly declared "the company simply had not prepared in time for the China launch."

The "NTSC/C" regional lockout for mainland China was specially created as the system is also a home NTSC DVD player with its specific Zone 6 regional code which is not compatible with the bordering countries (Japan is Zone 2; South Korea, Hong Kong, and Taiwan are all Zone 3, etc.)

The first batch of NTSC/C games was released in December 2005. Along with Sony Computer Entertainment Japan, third-party publishers included local branches of Bandai and Namco among others. NTSC-C PSTwo type is SCPH-70006 CB ("Black").

Marketing definition 
"C" stands for China. However Hong Kong, Macau and Taiwan are part of the NTSC-J region which was initially created for Japan.

The term NTSC-C is used to distinguish regions in console video games, which use televisions of NTSC or PAL display standards. NTSC-C is used as the name of the video gaming region of continental China, despite the country's use of PAL as the official TV standard instead of NTSC.

Games designated as part of this region will not run on hardware designated as part of the NTSC-J (that include Traditional Chinese 中文版 version for Hong Kong, Taiwan, Singapore and Malaysia, instead of Simplified Chinese for China), NTSC-US and PAL (or PAL-E, "E" stands for Europe) mostly due to the regional differences of the PAL (SECAM was also used in the early 1990s) and NTSC TV standards, but there is also a concern of copyright protection through regional lockout built into the video game systems and games themselves, as the same product can be released by different publishers on different continents.

Notes

See also 
 ATSC Standards
 BTSC
 NTSC
 NTSC-J
 NTSC-US
 PAL
 PAL/E
 SECAM

Video formats
Video game development
Digital rights management
Hardware restrictions